Fouad Bashour (1924–2003) was a noted cardiologist and Ashbel Smith professor of medicine at the University of Texas Southwestern Medical Center.

Education and practice 
Bashour was born in 1924 into an Orthodox Christian family in Tripoli, Lebanon. A family of physicians, his aunt was Dr. Zerefeh Bashur, the first female physician in the Levant. He received his MD in 1949 from the American University of Beirut and his PhD in 1957 from the University of Minnesota.

Following completion of his studies, Dr. Bashour moved to Dallas, Texas. He became instructor, and later professor, of internal medicine in 1959 at UT Southwestern, where he practiced until his death in 2003.

The annual Bashour Lectureship and the Bashour Distinguished Chair in Physiology at UT Southwestern are named in his honor.

John F. Kennedy 
Bashour was the resident cardiologist at Parkland Memorial Hospital in Dallas, Texas, on November 22, 1963, when President John F. Kennedy was shot and admitted to the hospital. The President was declared dead at around 12:55pm, according to Dr. Bashour’s notes.

Two days later, Lee Harvey Oswald, the man who shot the President, was himself shot while being escorted by police officers. Oswald was subsequently taken to Parkland Memorial Hospital, where the cardiologist treating him would again be Dr. Bashour.

Awards and honors 
 Marquis Who's Who in Medicine and Health Care
 Who's Who in America
 Who's Who in the South and Southwest
 Who's Who in Science and Engineering
 1000 Leaders of World Influence
 Knight Order of Holy Cross, Jerusalem

References 

American cardiologists
American University of Beirut alumni
University of Minnesota alumni